Soorarai Pottru is the soundtrack album, composed by G. V. Prakash Kumar, to the 2020 Indian Tamil-language drama film of the same name, directed by Sudha Kongara, starring Suriya and Paresh Rawal in the lead roles, along with Aparna Balamurali, Urvashi, and Mohan Babu in other prominent roles. The soundtrack album consists of 9 songs all of them were penned by lyricists Snehan, Yugabharathi, Vivek, Arunraja Kamaraj, Ekadesi, Maya Mahalingam and Arivu. The soundtrack album was released digitally on 24 July 2020, through the Sony Music record label.

Production 
The film's soundtrack album and background score is composed by G. V. Prakash Kumar, working with Suriya for the first time. On 7 April 2019, before the start of the film's shoot, Prakash announced that he would be collaborating with the band Thaikkudam Bridge for a rock number in the film. Govind Vasantha, film composer and the band's frontman had stated that he had recreated the tune phrase from "Urumbu", a track from the band's studio album Navarasam (2015), sung along with Christin Jos. Later Prakash, also announced that playback singer Dhee would record a funky number for the film. In July 2019, it was reported that, Senthil Ganesh sung a rustic number for the film. In August 2019, Prakash revealed that a new singer will record a number on the rock-genre, whose name is yet to be revealed soon, but did not sing the track. In October 2019, Harish Sivaramakrishnan of the Agam band recorded one song for the film. In November 2019, it was revealed that a special theme music will be included in the film's teaser. Later he announced that Suriya will croon the rap versions for the film's theme music, which was titled as "Maara Theme". The song marked his third stint as a singer after he sung for a song in Anjaan (2014) and the unreleased film Party. The audio rights have been acquired by Sony Music India.

Release 
The first single track, a theme song titled "Maara Theme" which was included in the film's official teaser, was released on 24 January 2020. The second single track, titled "Veyyon Silli" was released at a special launching ceremony that was held inside SpiceJet's Boeing 737 aircraft flying on mid-air on 13 February 2020, the first in Tamil cinema history to hold a film's music launch during mid-air flight. 100 first-time fliers including 70 school children are invited to the single track launch which was held during mid-air flight. The third single track "Mannurunda" was released on 9 March 2020. A 1-minute video of fourth single track "Kaattu Payale" was released on 23 July 2020, coinciding on Suriya's birthday, and the full song was released the same day,

The full album of Soorarai Pottru was released on 24 July 2020, in music platforms and in YouTube. The same day, the makers unveiled the soundtrack of its dubbed Telugu version, Aakasam Nee Haddhu Raa, although the soundtrack for the dubbed Malayalam and Kannada version were released, a day before the film's originally scheduled premiere (on 30 October 2020). Despite the full songs being released, The lyrical videos for "Aagasam", "Naalu Nimisham" and "Usurey" were released through YouTube on 23 October 6 and 10 November respectively. Post release, a bonus track "Kayilae Aagasam" was unveiled on 13 November 2020.

Reception 
The soundtrack album, especially the songs "Veyyon Silli" and "Kaattu Payale" received positive response from listeners. Reviewing for the former, Behindwoods stated that the song is enjoyable, similar to the another famous hit "Othayadi Pathayile" from Kanaa (2018). In their review, it stated "The song is well composed as it clearly makes you want to get from your sedentary position and tap your foot. The song has a rural background in its instrumental arrangement in the second layer if you pay attention and also employs good percussion to suit the current trends. When you have a powerful singer like Harish, it makes sense to leverage it and that is what GV Prakash has done by making use of his vocals in the interludes as well. The violin interlude does play a role the second time around and that is one of the highlights of the song." The song "Kaattu Payale" within its release in July 2020, was listed around top 100 songs in YouTube.

Reviewing for the soundtrack album, Vipin Nair of Music Aloud gave the album 4 out of 5 stating "G V Prakash Kumar has been on a pretty productive composing run these past couple of years, but in Soorarai Pottru he delivers his best soundtrack in a long time!"

As a year-ender special, Anjana Shekhar, listed "Kaattu Payale" and "Veyyon Silli" in her article about 7 Tamil Songs That Needed in Your Playlist, for the Indian digital news platform, The News Minute. The Times of India, listed ""Kaattu Payale" in one of in the 5 Chartbuster Tamil Songs of 2020. Five of its songs (with Kaattu Payale in the top-third position) were listed in their Top Tamil Tracks of 2020, for the music platform Spotify. Soorarai Pottru became the third most streamed Tamil album of JioSaavn in 2020, with "Veyyon Silli", became the most streamed Tamil song, in its music platform.

Controversy 
In September 2020, a petition was filed against the makers on the Madras High Court, about the song "Mannurunda" which had lyrics featuring offensive lines. The petitioner pointed out the lines: "Keezh saadhi udambukulla odurathu saakadaya? Andha mel saadhi kaaranuku rendu kombirundha kaatungaiya" (Is it drainage that runs in the body of a lower caste person? Show if that upper caste person has two horns), and queried that these lines could disrupt peace between two castes and create unwanted political tensions. Although, Indiaglitz in its review for the song (dated 9 March 2020), stated that "the song slaps hard on casteism and disparities".

Track listing

Awards

Notes

References 

2020 soundtrack albums
Tamil film soundtracks
Sony Music India soundtracks
G. V. Prakash Kumar soundtracks
Kannada film soundtracks
Malayalam film soundtracks